USS Southerner was a schooner purchased by the Union Navy to be used as a sunken obstruction in the waterways of the Confederate States of America. She was part of what was called the "stone fleet".

Service history
Southerner – a Chesapeake Bay schooner – was purchased by the Union Navy at Baltimore, Maryland, on 13 August 1861. The vessel was laden with stone and towed to Hampton Roads. On 26 August, she and sister stone schooner Mary and Hetty got underway with Flag Officer Silas Stringham's task force for the assault on Hatteras Inlet, North Carolina. There, she was used as a transport during the reduction of Fort Hatteras and Fort Clark on the 28th and 29th.
 
She presumably foundered sometime before 11 October 1861.

See also

Union Blockade

References
 

Ships of the Union Navy
Schooners of the United States Navy
Ships of the Stone Fleet